Ryde Sands and Wootton Creek  is a  Site of special scientific interest which stretches along the north-east coast of the Isle of Wight, from Wootton Bridge past Ryde and Seaview to Seagrove Bay. The majority of the area consists of intertidal sand and mud flats exposed at low water, a large proportion of this being Ryde Sands. Also within the site is Wootton Creek itself and the Alan Hersey Nature Reserve at Seaview Duver. The site was notified in 1993 for its biological features.

References

Natural England citation sheet

Sites of Special Scientific Interest on the Isle of Wight